"Listen People" is a song written by Graham Gouldman and performed by Herman's Hermits. The song was produced by Mickie Most. It was featured on their 1966 album, Volume 2: The Best of Herman's Hermits.
It reached #1 in Canada, #3 on both the Billboard Hot 100 and Australian charts, and #7 on both the New Zealand and Swedish charts in 1966.  
The song was also released in the United Kingdom as the B-side to their 1966 single, "You Won't Be Leaving".

Background
The theme is based on the traditional hymn "Jesus Let Us Come to Know You."

Other versions
The Outsiders released a version of the song on their 1966 album, Time Won't Let Me.
A Chinese Mandarin version titled 心事無從說起 was covered by Singaporean female singer Sakura Teng (櫻花) in 1966.

Popular culture
The Herman's Hermits version was featured in the 1965 film, When the Boys Meet the Girls and is on the film's soundtrack.

References

1966 songs
1966 singles
Songs written by Graham Gouldman
Herman's Hermits songs
Song recordings produced by Mickie Most
RPM Top Singles number-one singles
MGM Records singles